Otis Keilholtz (February 8, 1838 – September 13, 1883) was an American politician. He served in the Baltimore City Council in the 1870s and served as ex-officio Mayor of Baltimore when Mayor George P. Kane was sick and after he died in office in 1878. Keilholtz served in the Maryland House of Delegates and as Speaker of the Maryland House of Delegates in 1882.

Early life
Otis Keilholtz was born on February 8, 1838, at 92 North Greene Street in Baltimore. Keilholtz attended Baltimore City High School. He attended Georgetown University, but did not graduate. He then attended St. Mary's Seminary for two years.

Career
Keilholtz served in the Fifth Regiment, Company H, of the Maryland National Guard.

Keilholtz was a Democrat. Keilholtz served in the Baltimore City Council, representing the thirteenth ward, from 1874 to 1875 and 1877 to 1879. He also served as president of the first branch of Baltimore City Council in 1877 and 1878. Keilholtz served as ex-officio Mayor of Baltimore in 1878 when Mayor George P. Kane was sick in January 1878 and after his death in June 1878. In 1882, Keilholtz served in the Maryland House of Delegates, representing Baltimore, and as Speaker of the Maryland House of Delegates. He also served as president of the board of visitors to the Baltimore City Jail.

Personal life
Keilholtz married Emily. She was the first cousin of Louisiana Governor Samuel D. McEnery. She died in 1885. They had two sons and three daughters: Pierre, Otis, Adele, Claudia and Lydia.

Keilholtz was lifelong friends with Reverend Edward McColgan.

Keilholtz died of Bright's disease on September 13, 1883, at his house in Baltimore. He was buried at New Cathedral Cemetery (formerly Bonnie Brae Cemetery) in Baltimore.

References

External links
 Otis Keilholtz (Maryland State Archives)

1838 births
1883 deaths
Politicians from Baltimore
Georgetown University alumni 
St. Mary's Seminary and University alumni
Baltimore City Council members
Speakers of the Maryland House of Delegates
Democratic Party members of the Maryland House of Delegates
Mayors of Baltimore
Maryland National Guard personnel
19th-century American politicians